Robert Wilton Bass (September 16, 1921 – June 28, 1998) was a politician from Texas, United States, who served in the Texas House of Representatives from 1961-1969.

Life
Bass was born on September 16, 1921, the youngest of 6 siblings. His parents were Allie Bass and Stella Smith. Bass married Joann Sheppard and they had two children: Portia Coye Bass (1940-2008) and Penny Bass (1946-2006). He died aged 76, survived by his wife and children, and was buried at Texas State Cemetery.

Politics

He was elected in the 1960 election, and served from January 10, 1961. He also won the 1962, 1964, and 1966 elections, serving until January 14, 1969.

References

1921 births
1998 deaths
Members of the Texas House of Representatives
20th-century American politicians